Marie Dorin Habert (born 19 June 1986) is a retired French biathlete.

Career
She became junior world champion in relay (2004 and 2005).

She represented France at the 2010 Winter Olympics. She was also on the bronze medal-winning French relay team at the Biathlon World Championships 2009.

Dorin won a bronze in the women's 7.5 km sprint on 13 February 2010 and a silver in the relay. She won her first individual world cup victory at the 2015 world championships in Kontiolahti, Finland, in the sprint event, which was her first World Champion title as well. The next day she won the world championships pursuit, making it her second individual world cup victory and second gold medal in the world championships.

At the Pyeongchang 2018 Winter Olympics, she claimed gold with the French Team in the Mixed relay and took bronze in the Relay.

After the Olympics, she decided to end her career at the World Cup in Oslo.

She won her last women's relay with the French team on 17 March 2018 and ended her career with a 20th place in pursuit the next day.

Personal life
Dorin is married to retired French biathlete Lois Habert. She gave birth to their daughter Adele in September 2014 and returned to the Biathlon World Cup in January 2015. She had a second daughter Evie in January 2019.

Biathlon results
All results are sourced from the International Biathlon Union.

Olympic Games
4 medals (1 gold, 1 silver, 2 bronze)

*The mixed relay was added as an event in 2014.

World Championships
17 medals (5 gold, 8 silver, 4 bronze)

World Cup

Individual victories
7 victories (3 Sp, 2 Pu, 1 In, 1 MS)

Relay victories
8 victories (Victories at Winter Olympics are not counted as World Cup victories, but are listed here. )

References

External links
 
 
 
 
 
 

1986 births
Living people
Sportspeople from Lyon
French female biathletes
Biathletes at the 2010 Winter Olympics
Biathletes at the 2014 Winter Olympics
Biathletes at the 2018 Winter Olympics
Olympic biathletes of France
Medalists at the 2010 Winter Olympics
Medalists at the 2018 Winter Olympics
Olympic medalists in biathlon
Olympic gold medalists for France
Olympic silver medalists for France
Olympic bronze medalists for France
Biathlon World Championships medalists
Holmenkollen medalists
21st-century French women